"If You're Over Me" is a song recorded by British synthpop band Years & Years. Written by Olly Alexander and its producer Steve Mac, it was released on 10 May 2018 by Polydor Records, as the second single from the band's second studio album, Palo Santo (2018). The music video was directed by Fred Rowson with choreography by Aaron Sillis. The song was performed live on both the Palo Santo Tour and the Night Call Tour.
 
On 5 August 2022, "If You're Over Me" was certified double platinum by the British Phonographic Industry (BPI). The song has spent a total of 23 weeks on the UK Singles Chart.

Track listing
Digital download
"If You're Over Me" – 3:09
 
Digital download – acoustic
"If You're Over Me" (Acoustic) – 3:09

Digital download – remixes
"If You're Over Me" (Paul Woolford Remix) – 3:51
"If You're Over Me" (NOTD Remix) – 3:30
"If You're Over Me" (Sebastian Perez Remix) – 3:40
"If You're Over Me" (DECCO Remix) – 2:59
"If You're Over Me" (Tom & Collins Remix) – 3:25

Digital download – remix
"If You're Over Me" (Remix featuring Key) – 3:07

Charts

Weekly charts

Year-end charts

Certifications

References

2018 singles
2018 songs
Bubblegum pop songs
Years & Years songs
Polydor Records singles
Songs written by Steve Mac
Song recordings produced by Steve Mac
Songs written by Olly Alexander
Song recordings produced by Mark Ralph (record producer)